Edgar Lloyd (31 July 1886 – 3 January 1972) was a British long-distance runner. He competed in the marathon at the 1912 Summer Olympics.

References

1886 births
1972 deaths
Athletes (track and field) at the 1912 Summer Olympics
British male long-distance runners
British male marathon runners
Olympic athletes of Great Britain
People from Lewisham
Athletes from London